Creontiades pallidus is a species of true bug in the family Miridae. It is a serious pest of cotton and sorghum in Africa.

References

Mirini
Insect pests of millets
Insects described in 1839